Georgina, Lady Kennard (née Wernher; formerly Phillips; 17 October 1919 – 28 April 2011) was a British aristocrat who was considered "one of the best connected women in the country." She was connected to many prominent families such as the royal family and the Mountbattens, Grosvenors, Hamiltons and Burnetts.

Early life
Born Georgina Wernher in Edinburgh, Scotland, on 17 October 1919, she was the second child and elder daughter of Sir Harold Augustus Wernher, 3rd Bt, and Countess Anastasia de Torby.

She was a maternal granddaughter of Grand Duke Michael Mikhailovich of Russia (grandson of Tsar Nicholas I and first cousin of Tsar Alexander III), and also claimed direct descent from the Russian writer Alexander Pushkin and the Afro-Russian military officer Abram Petrovich Hannibal. The family's country home was Luton Hoo. Gina "came out" as a debutante in the 1937 "coronation" season, aged only 17 but already having completed her education with studies in domestic science.

On 10 October 1944, Gina Wernher married Lt.-Col. Harold "Bunny" Phillips (1909–1980), a former lover of Edwina, Countess Mountbatten of Burma. They had five children:

 Alexandra Anastasia Hamilton, Duchess of Abercorn  known as 'Sacha' and was god-daughter of Lord Louis Mountbatten (27 February 1946 – 9 December 2018)
 Nicholas Harold Phillips (23 August 1947 – 1 March 1991)
 Fiona Mercedes Burnett (born 30 March 1951), mother of Alexander Burnett
 Marita Georgina Crawley (born 28 May 1954)
 Natalia Ayesha Grosvenor, Duchess of Westminster (born 8 May 1959), mother of Lady Edwina Snow and Hugh Grosvenor, 7th Duke of Westminster

Lady Kennard's first husband, Harold Phillips, died in 1980. She was remarried in 1992 to Sir George Arnold Ford Kennard, 3rd Bt. (1915–1999).

Lady Kennard died at her home in London on 28 April 2011 aged 91 years old.

Ancestry

References

Sources
Burke's Peerage
Who's Who 2009

1919 births
2011 deaths
Daughters of baronets
Wives of baronets
Georgina
Scottish people of German descent
Scottish people of Russian descent
Nobility from Edinburgh
People from Central Bedfordshire District